Emmanuel Ekwueme  (born 22 November 1979) is a retired Nigerian football midfielder. He played for the Nigerian national team.

External links
 

Living people
1979 births
Nigerian footballers
Nigerian expatriate footballers
Polonia Warsaw players
Widzew Łódź players
Wisła Płock players
Aris Thessaloniki F.C. players
Veria F.C. players
Unia Janikowo players
Warta Poznań players
Znicz Pruszków players
LZS Piotrówka players
Expatriate footballers in Greece
Expatriate footballers in Poland
Nigerian expatriate sportspeople in Greece
Nigerian expatriate sportspeople in Poland
2004 African Cup of Nations players
NEPA Lagos players
Association football midfielders
Nigeria international footballers
People from Mbaise
Sportspeople from Imo State